Éric Antoine Ghislain Joseph, Viscount de Spoelberch (15 February 1903 – 17 January 1939) was a Belgian pilot. He was born in Brussels and died in Nivelles.

Family 
He was son of Guillaume de Spoelberch (1874–1947) and Colienne de Neufforge (1882–1929). He married Katharine Kelso Stewart 28 April 1932, in Haverford; Katherine's mother was Elsie Foster Cassatt (1875–1931), a sportswoman from a prominent Pennsylvania family, niece of artist Mary Cassatt and great-niece of president James Buchanan. The couple had two sons, Guillaume and Jacques de Spoelberch.

Career 
As a lieutenant in the Aéronautique Militaire he was one of two Belgian pilots sent to Britain to evaluate the Hawker Hurricane and the Supermarine Spitfire. In the following January he was killed in an air accident while flight-testing a plane.

As a bobsledder he competed in the 1936 Winter Olympics in Garmisch-Partenkirchen; he finished eighth both in the two-man and four-man events.

honours 
 Knight in the Order of Leopold.
 Knight in the Order of Leopold II.

References

1936 bobsleigh two-man results
1936 bobsleigh four-man results
Eric Vicomte de Spoelberch's profile at Sports Reference.com

1903 births
1939 deaths
Belgian Air Component officers
Belgian test pilots
Aviators killed in aviation accidents or incidents in Belgium
Belgian male bobsledders
Er
Bobsledders at the 1936 Winter Olympics
Olympic bobsledders of Belgium
Sportspeople from Brussels
Victims of aviation accidents or incidents in 1939